Taarak Janubhai Mehta (26 December 1929–1 March 2017) was an Indian columnist, humourist, writer and playwright who is best known for the column Duniya Ne Undha Chasma, and was a well-known figure in Gujarati theatre.

His humorous weekly column first appeared in Chitralekha in March 1971 and looked at contemporary issues from a different perspective. He published 80 books in his whole career.

In 2008, SAB TV – a popular entertainment channel in India – started the sitcom Taarak Mehta Ka Ooltah Chashmah based on his column, which soon became the flagship show of the channel. Actor Shailesh Lodha portrayed Mehta in the show until September 2022. He is currently portrayed by actor Sachin Shroff.

Personal life
Taarak Mehta belonged to the Gujarati Nagar Brahmin community. He moved to Ahmedabad, Gujarat, with his second wife, Indu, of over 30 years. His first wife, Ila who later married Manohar Doshi (died 2006), also lived in the same apartment building. He had a daughter from his first marriage, Eshani, who lives in the United States, and has two grandchildren, Kushaan and Shailee.

Mehta died at the age of 87 years on March 1, 2017 after a prolonged illness. His family donated his body to medical research.

Awards

Mehta was awarded the Padma Shri, the fourth highest civilian award of India, in 2015. Gujarat Sahitya Akademi awarded him Sahitya Gaurav Puraskar in 2011 and Ramanlal Nilkanth Hasya Paritoshik (posthumously) in 2017.

Bibliography

Novels
 Mumbai ma Mehmaan-Yajmaan Pareshan
 Mehta na Monghera Mehmaan
 Aa Duniya Panjarapole
 Tapu Tapori
 Kaise Yeh Jodi Milaye More Ram
 Betaaj Batlibaaj Popatlal Taraaj
 Albelun America, Vanthelun America
 Salo Sundarlal
 Champu-Sulu ni Jugalbandi
 Kanu Kagdo Dahitharu Lai Gayo
 Action Replay Part 1 & Part 2 (Autobiography)
 Matka King Mandve Halo Africa
 Utpatang America
 Navrani Nondhpothi
 Tarak Mehta no Tapudo
 Tarak Mehta na Undha Chashma
 2010 na Undha Chashma
 Tapuda no Tarkhat
 Tarak Mehta ni Toli Pardesh na Pravase
 Pan Khay Popatlal Hamar
 Khurshidas Makkhan Ghase
 Dodh Dahya Tarak Mehta ni Diary
 Lade Tenu Ghar Vase
 Double Trouble
 Return Ticket
 Duniya ne Oondha Chashmah
 Champaklal Tapuni Jugalbandhi
 Ek Shaam Boss ke Naam
 Hu, Boss ane Banevi
 Naraji nu Rajinamu
 Wah America
 Tarak Mehta ni Navlikao

Natak (Plays)
 Jojo Hasi na Kadhta
 Dahpan ki Dadh
 Bandhi Mutthi Lakhni
 Ae to emaj Chale
 Ek Murakhne Evi Tev
 Tarak Mehta ni TV Natikao
 Tarak Mehta na Ekankio
 Tarak Mehta na Prahaaso
 Aath Ekankio

References

External links
 
 Tarak Mehta full information
 Interview of Tarak Mehta on SpeakBindas by Devang Vibhakar
 Interview by Prabodh Desai - An excellent source of information with many details about his work

1929 births
2017 deaths
Indian columnists
Gujarati-language writers
Indian humorists
Writers from Ahmedabad
20th-century Indian translators
Translators to Gujarati
Recipients of the Padma Shri in arts
Journalists from Gujarat
20th-century Indian journalists